The 1983–84 Football League season was Birmingham City Football Club's 81st in the Football League and their 49th in the First Division. They finished in 20th position in the 22-team division, so were relegated to the Second Division for 1984–85. They entered the 1983–84 FA Cup in the third round proper and lost to Watford in the quarter-final. In the League Cup, after defeating Notts County in the third round only after three replays, they lost to Liverpool in the fourth round after a replay.

Mick Harford was the club's top scorer with 15 goals in all competitions; if only league games are counted, Harford and Howard Gayle were joint leaders with 8. The highest attendance, of 40,220 against Watford in the FA Cup sixth round, was the last 40,000 crowd seen at St Andrew's, as of 2012; the ground capacity was reduced to around 30,000 when the stadium was converted to all-seater in the 1990s.

Football League First Division

League table (part)

FA Cup

League Cup

Appearances and goals

Numbers in parentheses denote appearances as substitute.
Players with name struck through and marked  left the club during the playing season.
Players with names in italics and marked * were on loan from another club for the whole of their season with Birmingham.

See also
Birmingham City F.C. seasons

References
General
 
 
 Source for match dates, league positions and results: 
 Source for lineups, appearances, goalscorers and attendances: Matthews (2010), Complete Record, pp. 402–03.

Specific

Birmingham City F.C. seasons
Birmingham City